Ulrich I of Württemberg may refer to:
 Ulrich I, Count of Württemberg, Count of Württemberg in 1241-1265
 Ulrich, Duke of Württemberg, Duke of Württemberg in 1498-1519